The Free Church of Scotland (Continuing) (Scottish Gaelic: An Eaglais Shaor Leantainneach) is a Scottish Presbyterian denomination which was formed in January 2000.  It claims to be the true continuation of the Free Church of Scotland, hence its name.

Formation
In 1996, Professor Donald Macleod, later to be principal of the Free Church College in Edinburgh, was acquitted of charges of sexual assault when a sheriff ruled there had been a conspiracy against him.
An organisation called the Free Church Defence Association believed that "it was wrong not to put Professor Macleod on trial in the General Assembly and that the majority has therefore departed from the principle that allegations of misconduct must be investigated not by a Committee of the General Assembly but by the whole General Assembly."
The FCDA's chairman, Rev Maurice Roberts, was suspended for contumacy in June 1999 for refusing to withdraw his claim that General Assembly in May of that year was characterised by "gross and irremediable wickedness and hypocrisy".

In August 1999, the FCDA's magazine, Free Church Foundations, referred to "the evil of Mr Roberts' suspension." A deadline was set for 30 November 1999 for the FCDA to disband, which it did not. Libels were drawn up against 22 ministers who refused to comply, and in a hearing by the Commission of Assembly on 19–20 January 2000 those libels were declared to be relevant. The 22 ministers were suspended, and they responded by leaving the commission.

On 20 January 2000 the 'Free Church of Scotland (Continuing)' was formed when those ministers and a number of others adopted a "Declaration of Reconstitution of the historic Free Church of Scotland."
Johnston McKay suggests that although on the surface the split was about Donald Macleod, in reality it was about theology, with the FCDA "composed of people who adhere much more firmly to the Westminster Confession of Faith."

Legal issues

Following their departure, FCC sought a declarator from the Court of Session as to ownership of the central funds and properties of the Church. When the appeal was sent to the Outer House of the Court of Session, Lady Paton dismissed their action without granting absolvitor.  In March 2007 the Free Church of Scotland proceeded to take legal action at Broadford, on the island of Skye, seeking to reclaim the church manse. The Free Church (Continuing) lost the action at first instance on the decision of Lord Uist, and also lost their appeal to the Inner House of the Court of Session.

The FCC expressed its intention to appeal both the above decisions, but in 2009, the International Conference of Reformed Churches noted that the FCC had "withdrawn its appeal of the civil matter that was pending."

Recognition

The denomination is a member of the International Conference of Reformed Churches  and of Affinity.

Congregations

The Free Church of Scotland (Continuing) presently has 34 functioning congregations, of which 7 are in North America. These churches belong to 6 Presbyteries: the Northern, the Skye and Lochcarron, the Inverness, the United States of America, the Outer Hebrides and the Southern Presbyteries. There are 6 congregations and preaching stations in the Atlanta metropolitan area, Washington Metro, Upstate South Carolina, Mebane, NC and St. Louis, MO in the United States, a congregation in Canada, Northern Ireland, and a seminary and demonstration farm in Zambia.

Seminary
The Free Church of Scotland (Continuing) maintains a seminary on the outskirts of Inverness for the training of its ministers.

Music
The Free Church Continuing continues to hold to the exclusive use of metrical Psalms sung without instrumental accompaniment in worship, a position which the Free Church of Scotland has ceased to hold.

See also
 John MacLeod, Principal Clerk of Assembly, Moderator of 2006 General Assembly

References

External links

The Free Church of Scotland (Continuing)
The Free Church Continuing Seminary
When Justice Failed in Church and State (An Explanation of the Division in the Free Church of Scotland) from the FCC's view

Reformed denominations in the United Kingdom
Presbyterianism in Scotland
Religious organisations based in Scotland
Christian organizations established in 2000
Presbyterian denominations established in the 20th century
2000 establishments in Scotland
Presbyterian denominations in Canada
Presbyterian denominations in the United States
Presbyterian denominations in Scotland
Evangelical denominations in North America
Church of Scotland